James W. Johnston (29 August 1792 – 21 November 1873) was a Nova Scotia lawyer and politician. He served as Premier of the colony from 1857 to 1860 and again from 1864. He was also Government Leader prior to the granting of responsible government in 1848. He was a Conservative and supporter of Confederation.  Johnston was a descendant of Loyalists who fled the United States during the revolutionary war. Johnston was a member of the Tory establishment in Nova Scotia. In 1837 he was appointed to the Legislative Council and while he sometimes supported reform, he was generally a critic and opponent of responsible government and the introduction of party government.

In 1843 he left the Legislative Council to run for the elected legislative assembly and became government leader because of the support of moderate members who opposed the "extremism" of Joseph Howe but were willing to make some concessions.

He lost power when responsible government was instituted in 1848 but continued as leader of what became the Conservative Party and served as Premier from 1857 to 1860 and again from 1863 to 1864 before being appointed to the bench.

Johnston was an early supporter of Canadian confederation, seeing it as a means of correcting the failings of responsible government.

References
 

1792 births
1873 deaths
Johnston, James W.
Premiers of Nova Scotia
People from Annapolis County, Nova Scotia
Colony of Nova Scotia people
Canadian people of Scottish descent
Members of the Legislative Council of Nova Scotia
Colony of Nova Scotia judges
Nova Scotia political party leaders